Strident vowels (also called sphincteric vowels) are strongly pharyngealized vowels accompanied by an (ary)epiglottal trill, with the larynx being raised and the pharynx constricted. Either the epiglottis or the arytenoid cartilages thus vibrate instead of the vocal cords. That is, the epiglottal trill is the voice source for such sounds.

Strident vowels are fairly common in Khoisan languages, which contrast them with simple pharyngealized vowels. Stridency is used in onomatopoeia in Zulu and Lamba. Stridency may be a type of phonation called harsh voice. A similar phonation, without the trill, is called ventricular voice; both have been called pressed voice. Bai, of southern China, has a register system that has allophonic strident and pressed vowels.

There is no official symbol for stridency in the IPA, but a superscript  (for a voiced epiglottal trill) is often used. In some literature, a subscript double tilde (≈) is sometimes used, as seen here on the letter :

It has been accepted into Unicode, at code point U+1DFD.

Languages 
These languages use phonemic strident vowels:

 Tuu languages
 Taa (See Taa vowels)
 ǃKwi (ǃUi)
 Nǁng (a dialect cluster; moribund)
 ǀXam (a dialect cluster, including Nǀuusaa) †

See also 

 Nasal vowel
 Vowel

References

Sources 
 

Phonation

br:Vogalenn skiltr